Knut Henry "Krylbo" Eriksson (23 January 1920 – 8 January 2000) was a Swedish middle-distance runner who specialized in the 1500 m event. In 1946 he finished second behind Lennart Strand, both at the national and European Championships. On 15 July 1947, at the national championships at Malmö, Eriksson and Strand had a very close 1500 m race. Strand won, equaling the world record at 3:43.0, and Eriksson finished second, setting his all-time personal best at 3:44.4. Eriksson beat Strand at the 1948 Swedish Championships and at the 1948 Summer Olympics. He retired the same year and returned to his work as a fireman.

Eriksson was one of the three Olympic Flame lighters of the 1956 Summer Olympics equestrian events at Stockholm. He held a world record in the 4 × 1500 m relay, together with three other fireman from his athletics club in Gävle.

References

1920 births
2000 deaths
Swedish male middle-distance runners
European Athletics Championships medalists
Medalists at the 1948 Summer Olympics
Olympic gold medalists for Sweden
Olympic gold medalists in athletics (track and field)
Athletes (track and field) at the 1948 Summer Olympics
People from Avesta Municipality
Sportspeople from Dalarna County